Luke "Spike" Kohlbecker (born December 13, 2002) is an American racing driver. He currently competes in the U.S. F2000 National Championship with Turn 3 Motorsport with Ignite Autosport. Kohlbecker previously competed in the championship with Ignite Autosport with Cape Motorsports.

Career

U.S. F2000 National Championship 
In February of 2021, Cape Motorsports forged an alliance with Ignite Autosport to field two full-time entries in the 2021 U.S. F2000 National Championship. Kohlbecker was signed as one of the drivers. Kohlbecker made his series debut at Barber Motorsports Park and scored a top-ten finish. At the first race at Road America, Kohlbecker scored a podium finishing 3rd. 

In 2022, Kohlbecker switched to Turn 3 Motorsports. His entry was also being co-run by Ignite Autosport once again.

Racing record

Career summary 

* Season still in progress.

Complete Toyota Racing Series results 
(key) (Races in bold indicate pole position) (Races in italics indicate fastest lap)

American open-wheel racing results

U.S. F2000 National Championship 
(key) (Races in bold indicate pole position) (Races in italics indicate fastest lap) (Races with * indicate most race laps led)

* Season still in progress.

References 

2002 births
Living people
Racing drivers from Missouri
Racing drivers from St. Louis
Formula Ford drivers
Toyota Racing Series drivers
U.S. F2000 National Championship drivers

MP Motorsport drivers
United States F4 Championship drivers